Bhawal National Park is a nature reserve and the national park of Bangladesh.

History 
Bhawal National Park was established and maintained as a National Park in 1974; it was officially declared in 1982 under the Wildlife Act of 1974. By origin, it was the forest of Madhupur under the rule of Bhawal Estate. It is located in Gazipur, Dhaka Division of Bangladesh, approximately  40 km north of Dhaka city, only 20 km drive from Gazipur and 20 km from Kapasia.  The core area of the park covers 940 hectares (2,322 acres) but extends to 5,022 ha (12,409 acres) of surrounding forest. Its purpose is to protect important habitats as well as to provide opportunities for recreation. It has been kept under IUCN Management Category V, as a protected landscape. The most common flora  is the unique coppice sal forest. The area was noted for peacocks, tiger, leopard, black panther, elephant, clouded leopard and sambar deer. However much of the wildlife had disappeared and only a few species remain. Also, most of the forest has been denuded and is now occupied by forestry companies or displaced people.

Most of this area was covered by forests fifty years ago and the dominant species was Sal (Shorea robusta). Illegal deforestation has left only 600 km2 of the forest and  new trees and woodlands have been planted.

Ecology 
The park has 345 plant species, including 151 different  tree species, 53  shrubs, 106 herbs and 34 climber species. The wildlife in the park includes   13 mammals, 9 reptiles, 5 birds and 5 amphibians. In addition the Forest Department has recently introduced  peacocks, deer, pythons, and cat fish.

Gallery

See also
 Madhupur tract
 List of protected areas of Bangladesh

References

External links

  (PDF) Wildlife Biodiversity in Bhawal National Park
 Reading tools - Indexing Metadata - Wildlife Biodiversity in Bhawal National Park
 Nishorgo Biodiversity Program
 Protected Areas in Bangladesh

National parks of Bangladesh
Forests of Bangladesh
Protected areas established in 1974
1974 establishments in Bangladesh
Lower Gangetic Plains moist deciduous forests